Ngāi Tai ki Tāmaki is a Māori tribe that is based in the area around Clevedon, part of the Auckland region (Tāmaki in the Māori language). It is one of the twelve members of the Hauraki Collective of tribes.

The founding ancestors of Ngāi Tai ki Tāmaki came to New Zealand in the Tainui migration canoe and left it when it was dragged across Te Tō Waka, the portage from the Tāmaki River to the Manukau Harbour. Their descendants occupied parts of the Hauraki Gulf, including east Auckland as far inland as Otara and Maungarei, as well as Clevedon, Maraetai and Howick. Te Irirangi Drive, a major highway in Manukau City, is named after one of their rangatira (chiefs), Tara Te Irirangi.

Ngāi Tai has a marae at Umupuia Beach, between Maraetai and Clevedon. They also use the Ngāti Tamaoho marae at Karaka.

In 2015 the Crown settled with Ngāi Tai ki Tāmaki over historic grievances, including both financial and cultural compensation.

See also
List of iwi

References

External links
Ngāi Tai ki Tāmaki website

 
Iwi and hapū